Homeboyz is a 2007 young adult fiction novel written by California teacher Alan Lawrence Sitomer. It is the third and final book of the Hoopster Trilogy. The book won the Top Ten Picks for Reluctant Young Adult Readers award from the American Library Association in 2008.

Summary
The events of Homeboyz takes place four to five years after the events in Hip Hop High School. The book's main character is 17-year-old Dixon Theodore Anderson, nicknamed Teddy. Teddy is a computer hacker and a very intelligent young man, and also very tough. Teddy's entire neighborhood is overrun by gangsters and his 14-year-old sister, Tina Anderson, is killed in a crossfire. While the Anderson family mourns her death, Teddy goes to his car to seek vengeance. He is unsuccessful in getting revenge and is arrested. He then spends time in a California juvenile prison waiting for a judge to hear his case. During this time, Teddy is treated as if he was a gangster. He is set free, but is put under house arrest and is enrolled in a probation program run by Officer Mariana Diaz. Teddy is forced to spend five days each week mentoring a 12-year-old kid named Micah. Teddy has difficulty tutoring Micah because he wants to be a gangster. But through Micah, Teddy is taught how to love someone and see how people can change. The killer of his little sister is found, but he is not from the 0-1-0 gang. The shooter responsible for the murder of his little sister is Mumzy B.

References

External links
 Disney Hyperion biography of Author Alan Lawrence Sitomer
 
 
 Homeboyz Official Website

2007 American novels
Urban fiction
African-American young adult novels
American young adult novels
Hip hop books
The Hoopster
African-American novels